Ed Kennedy may refer to:

Ed Kennedy (American politician) (1951), a Massachusetts State Senator
Ed Kennedy (infielder) (1861–1912), Major League Baseball infielder
Ed Kennedy (outfielder) (1856–1905), Major League Baseball outfielder
Ed Kennedy (rugby union), Australian rugby union player
Edward Kennedy (journalist) (c. 1905–1963), journalist who first reported the German surrender in World War II

See also
Ted Kennedy (disambiguation)
Edward Kennedy (disambiguation)